Marc Kramer is an American serial entrepreneur, business book author and journalist. He founded the country's first formally organized investor angel network, the Pennsylvania Private Investors Group, now called the Private Investors Forum, and the country's first cyber bank insurance product for small businesses, Commercial Deposit Insurance. Marc is also founder of Dads & Daughters, a group that made sure that entrepreneurial fathers and their daughters got together every Saturday for uninterrupted time.

Biography 

Marc Kramer was born in Coatesville, Pennsylvania, to Robert Kramer, a small business owner, and Shelly Kramer, a fine China sales representative for Macy's Department Store. Kramer graduated from Coatesville High School in 1978. He attended and graduated from West Virginia University Perley Isaac Reed School of Journalism in 1982 and obtained a Master's in Management in 1991 from The Pennsylvania State University.

Career 
Kramer started his career as sports writer for the Village News and the Coatesville Record. He left sports writing in 1983 and joined Berkheimer Associates to become a tax administrator. While working for Berkheimer Associates, Kramer started a part-time marketing business called Kramer Marketing. His firm client, the Downingtown Marketplace, hired Kramer to be assistant manager in 1984.

During his time at the Downingtown Marketplace, Kramer started the Downingtown Antique Hub, a small business center and a mirrored closet store business.  Kramer left the Downingtown Marketing place in 1987 to become the first executive director of the Penn State Technology Development Center in Great Valley, Pa, which he grew from one company to 53 and lead the nation in minority startup companies.

In 1990, Kramer left the Penn State Technology to start the Eastern Technology Council, which was the second largest technology council in the United States.  During his time with ETC, he started the Pennsylvania Private Investors Group and a national newspaper, Technology Times.

Kramer started Kramer Communications, a marketing and new venture development consultancy in 1997. While running Kramer Communications, he started PA Artist Entrepreneur in 2003, co-founded in 2003 with his then wife, Jacqueline Kramer, Expert Speakers, marketing business professionals to trade associations and corporations and was sold to Speaker Match in 2005, Prompt Payment, which provided reverse factoring service, in 2007, and Commercial Deposit Insurance, which insures small business bank accounts against cyber theft of funds, in 2012.

Kramer is the executive director of the Private Investors Forum and runs the  Angel Venture Fair, which draws entrepreneurs from all over the world to present their business plans to angel investors.

Currently, Kramer is the executive director of the Angel Venture Fair, which brings together entrepreneurs and investors from around the world, and formerly Executive-in-Residence at Saint Joseph's University in Philadelphia, Pa.

Kramer has taught marketing, entrepreneurship, marketing, management and family business at the University of Pennsylvania Wharton School of Business, Temple University Fox School of Business, Drexel University LeBow School of Business, University of Louisville in Panama City, Panama, Universidad de Pacifico in Lima, Peru, Universidad de Los Andes, Bogota, Colombia, Rutgers University Rohrer College of Business at Rowan University.

Marc launched a podcast in March of 2020 featuring business book authors around the world, The Best Business Minds. This podcast won The Academy of Interactive & Visual Arts-2022 Communicator Awards Distinction Series-Business Podcasts, and has listeners in 68 countries.

Personal 

Marc Kramer was married to Jacqueline Kadoch, a Spanish interpreter for social service organizations, from 1984 to 2013. He has two daughters, Ariel Kramer, president of Klover Communications, and Sydney Kramer, author of Cookie Dalmatian Mysteries. Kramer also has two sisters, Dr. Randi Braman, a family doctor in Owings Mills, Maryland, and Leslie Kramer, a Human Resources leader.

Awards 

 Inc. (magazine) Entrepreneur of the Year award in 1991.
 American Electronics Association Spirit of America Award in 1994.
 Top 30 Business Books in 2000 by Executive Book Summaries.
 Top 40 Under 40 Philadelphia Business Journal Business Leader in 1991
 Philadelphia Jaycees Top Five Young Business Leaders in 1993, 1994 and 1995.
 Small Business Journalist of the Year by the Center City Proprietors Association of Philadelphia in 2006.
 Race for Peace in 2017
 The Finance Monthly Family Business Coach and Business Planning Expert of the Year 2022
 The Academy of Interactive & Visual Arts-Communicator Awards Distinction Series-Business Podcasts 2022
 The DotComm Award 2022 
 W3 Award for General Book Series-Gold 2022
 Davey Awards Gold General-Business for Podcasts 2022
 Davey Awards Silver General-Interview/Talk Show for Podcasts 2022
 Philadelphia Award in the Training Centre 2022
 M&A Total Global Awards-Family Business Coach & Business Planning Expert of the Year 2023

External links

Books 
 Yes You Can: How to Become an Entrepreneur to Control Your Professional and Financial Future, Fall 2010, Sterling and Ross
 Consulting: The Million Dollar Start-Up Control Your Financial Future, published by Entrepreneur Press, 2003
 Web Sites Built to Last, Adams Media, 2002
 Financing & Building an E-Commerce Venture, Prentice Hall Press, 2001
 Small Business Turnaround, Adams Media, 1999
 Power Networking, NTC Publishing, 1997.

Articles 
 "WVU Grad Helping Small Businesses Fend Off Cyber Attacks", WVU Alumni Magazine
 “An Insurance Agency to Protect Small Business After A Cyber Attack”, Fast Company, October 30, 2013
 “Business That Matters-Fighting Fraud”,  Butler Business, July 2013
 “Radnor Company Protecting Small Businesses From Losing Big From Cyber Thieves”, Mainline Times, June 27, 2013
 “How Much Insurance Do You Need”, The Huffington Post, April 5, 2013
 “Staples With Food, Clothing And Stellar Returns”, Forbes.com, May 3, 2013
 “William Draper III keynotes 14th annual Angel Venture Fair, 300 angels and entrepreneurs attend”, Technically Philly, May 2012
 “Back From The Brink”, April 22, 2012
 “Getting Business From Strangers”, CMO. Com, September 1, 2011
 “Risk Averse? Start Your Own Business”, Main Street, January 13, 2009
 “Acquisition”, Daily Local News, March 8, 2007
 “Turn for the Best”, Black Enterprise Magazine, August 1, 2006
 “Artists Learn New Craft”, Topeka Capital Journal, October 7, 2003
 “Navigating the Road to Recovery Family-Owned Businesses Pose Special Challenges”, Turnaround Management Association Magazine, June 1, 2003
 “Down But Not Out, TechBanc May Get New Name”, Philadelphia Business Journal, January 21, 2002
 “Fixer Upper”, by Nicole Torres, Entrepreneur Magazine, November 1, 2001
 “Keep It Goin”, by Ellen Paris, Entrepreneur Magazine, November 30, 2000
 “Taming the Techno Beast”, Business Week, June 8, 2000
 “Mr. Fixit”, by Scott Smith, Entrepreneur Magazine, July 31, 2000

Television/Radio 
 Fox Business New-Marc Kramer interviewed by Connell McShane
 How Writing A Book Sets You Apart From The Competition, BizBook Radio
 At Holiday Time No Rest For the Weary Entrepreneur, NPR Radio, December 20, 2012
 Raising Money From Angels, Executive Leaders Radio, April 2012

Patents 
 AR/NOW, August 7, 2007

Living people
American businesspeople
Year of birth missing (living people)